The lateral dorsal nucleus is a nucleus of the thalamus. It is the most anterior of the dorsal lateral nuclei.

It acts in concert with the anterior nuclei of thalamus.

It receives significant input from several subdivisions of visual cortex, and has a primary output to parietal cortex on the dorsolateral cortical convexity, giving it access to limbic forebrain nuclei important for emotion and behavior functions.

References 

Thalamic nuclei